Lions Book or Lion Books may refer to:

 Lion Books, a 1950 Japanese manga series turned experimental anime
 Lion Books, an imprint of the British book publishing company Lion Hudson
 Lion Books (publisher), an imprint of the American book publishing company Martin Goodman
 Lion (comics), a 1950 British comic book
 Lions' Commentary on UNIX 6th Edition, with Source Code, a Unix kernel book by John Lions